Showkatur Rahman (born 12 January 1954) is a former Bangladeshi cricket umpire. He stood in one Test match, Bangladesh vs. Zimbabwe, in 2001 and two ODI games between 2001 and 2002.

See also
 List of Test cricket umpires
 List of One Day International cricket umpires

References

1954 births
Living people
People from Khulna District
Bangladeshi Test cricket umpires
Bangladeshi One Day International cricket umpires